Storm FC is an American soccer club based in Pembroke Pines, Florida member of the NPSL  playing in the South Region - Sunshine Conference. The club was founded in 2013 and currently competes against Jacksonville Armada U23, Miami United, Orlando Kraze United SC, Miami Fusion, Naples United, Beaches FC and Boca Raton FC in the Sunshine Conference.

History 
The club was officially accepted into the National Premier Soccer League on October 3, 2013.

Year by year

Stadium 
Storm FC used to play at Central Broward Regional Park in Lauderhill, Florida, moving to Pembroke Pines Charter High School Stadium, a 3000-seat stadium in Pembroke Pines, Florida, for the 2016 season.

References

External links
Official Storm FC site
Official NPSL site
Club Facebook page
Club Twitter page

Association football clubs established in 2013
National Premier Soccer League teams
2013 establishments in Florida
Soccer clubs in South Florida
Pembroke Pines, Florida